Mount Dromedary is the name of:

In Australia
Mount Gulaga, a mountain in New South Wales near Tilba Tilba, named by James Cook in 1770, and officially renamed with its indigenous name in 2006
Mount Dromedary (central New South Wales) near the settlement of Mount Hope on the Kidman Way
Mount Dromedary (Queensland)
Mount Dromedary (Tasmania)